Zimbabwe Airways (Private) Limited (operating as Zimbabwe Airways) , was a government-owned airline in Zimbabwe.

In 2018, the government dropped the plan to launch this airline.

Overview
The national carrier, Air Zimbabwe, applied to the  State Procurement Board (SPB) in October 2016 for permission to acquire four B777-200ER aircraft formerly flown by Malaysia Airlines. Permission was duly granted in November of the same.

Negotiations were carried out in secret, so as not to jeopardize the sensitive deal. Eventually the State put together enough money to pay for two of the B777s and one Embraer E-Jet. However, by the time the planes arrived in the country, Air Zimbabwe had deteriorated to such an extent, that it could not present a "credible business plan to run the planes on a sustainable, profitable basis". The government registered Zimbabwe Airways, which developed a credible business plan. The government created "Zimbabwe Aviation Leasing Company", which owns the planes and leases them to Zimbabwe Airways. As of April 2018, Zimbabwe Airways is yet to receive an Air operator's certificate (AOC), from the Zimbabwe Civil Aviation Authority.

Ownership and management
According to Patrick Chinamasa, the Zimbabwean Finance Minister, Zimbabwe Airlines is 100 percent owned by the government of Zimbabwe and was created to facilitate the national aviation industry and to relieve the cash-strapped and financially ailing national carrier, Air Zimbabwe, with over US$300 million in debts.

Destinations
The destinations of the airline are being finalized, but are expected to include London, Johannesburg, Beijing and large metropolitan and tourist cities inside Zimbabwe.

Fleet
, the Zimbabwe Airways fleet consisted of the following aircraft:

See also
 Transportation in Zimbabwe

References

External links
Zimbabwe government buys Boeing planes, leases them to new airline
Zim Airways Plane Arrives, Chinamasa Says It Does Not Belong To Former First Family

Defunct airlines of Zimbabwe
Airlines established in 2018
Airlines disestablished in 2018
Government-owned airlines
2018 establishments in Zimbabwe
Companies based in Harare